Mullerochloa is a monotypic genus of flowering plants belonging to the family Poaceae. It just contains one species, Mullerochloa moreheadiana (F.M.Bailey) K.M.Wong 

It is native to Queensland in north-eastern Australia.

The grass forms clumps and grows up to 12m tall. Other sources say it can be up to two hundred feet (sixty meters) in length. Culms (aerial stem bearing the inflorescence), will get up to 4cm in diameter however they are thin walled. It has large leaves and doesn’t have basal branches.

The genus name of Mullerochloa is in honour of Lennox Muller, an Australian psychologist turned exotic plant farmer in Innisfail, Far North Queensland.<ref>{{cite web |title=Currie Connect' '  University of Western Australia |url=https://www.web.uwa.edu.au/__data/assets/pdf_file/0006/1307346/Currie_Connect_web.pdf |website=Currie Connect |access-date=29 May 2022 |language=en}}</ref>  The Latin specific epithet of moreheadiana is in honour of Boyd Dunlop Morehead (1843–1905), an English-born Australian politician.
Both genus and species were first described and published in Blumea Vol.50 on pages 434-435 in 2005.

References

Other sources
 H.T. Clifford, Austrobaileya Vol. 4, No. 1 (1993), pp. 131-133, Bambusa moreheadiana'' F.M. Bailey (Magnoliophyta: Poaceae)

Bambusoideae
Bambusoideae genera
Plants described in 2005
Flora of Queensland